National Power Training Institute (NPTI), is a government training institution under Ministry of Power, Government of India with its Corporate Office at Faridabad. NPTI had been providing its dedicated service for more than five decades.

History
The Central Water and Power Commission (Power Wing) established Thermal Power Station Personnel Training Institutes in 1965–1975 at Neyveli (1965), Durgapur (1968), Badarpur, Delhi (1974) and Nagpur (1975) for training the engineers of thermal power stations which were being established in the country during that time. It also established the Power Systems Training Institute (PSTI) in 1972 and Hot Line Training Centre (HLTC) in 1974 at Bangalore. With the bifurcation of the Central Water and Power Commission into the Central Electricity Authority (CEA) and Central Water Commission (CWC) in the 1970s, the Institute came under the Central Electricity Authority (CEA). In the late 1970s the Raj Dekshya Committee set up by the Government of India to improve the power sector of the country recommended among many things formal training for the personnel employed in the power industry. Accordingly, the Indian Electricity Rule was amended to make training mandatory for the personnel employed in the generating stations and associated sub stations. With this the Thermal Power Station Personnel Training Institutes under the Central Electricity Authority were carved out and formed into a separate autonomous body under the Ministry of Power as the Power Engineers Training Society (PETS) in 1980 to give more importance to Power Training and to have an accelerated growth of the Institutes. Later, in 1993 Power Engineers Training Society (PETS) was renamed as National Power Training Institute (NPTI). Power Systems Training Institute (PSTI) and Hot Line Training Centre (HLTC) was merged with NPTI in 2002.

The National Power Training Institute (NPTI) grew continuously through the tenure of Indian governments. The Institute, which previously conducted training only in thermal power generation has now equipped itself to conduct training in all segments of the power sector i.e. generation, transmission and distribution. In the last four decades of its existence NPTI has trained thousands of engineers, supervisors and technicians from most of the Electricity Boards, public and private sector utilities and personnel from developing nations.

References

Electric power in India
Government-owned companies of India
Government agencies for energy (India)
Education in Faridabad
Companies based in Haryana
Maulana Abul Kalam Azad University of Technology
Education in Delhi
Training organisations in India
Ministry of Power (India)
Universities and colleges in Nagpur
1965 establishments in East Punjab
Government agencies established in 1965